Thambuddhe Pagoda (Sambuddhe Pagoda) is one of the famous pagodas in Monywa of Sagaing Region.

Photo gallery

References

Pagodas in Myanmar
Sagaing Region